is the 2010 sequel to the 2004 film Zebraman. The film features Show Aikawa reprising his leading role from the original, and also stars Riisa Naka and Masahiro Inoue. The film did poorly in Japanese box offices, which may be due to the film's theme of a religious war with the antagonists portrayed as analogies of the Happy Science movement in Japan.

On November 29, 2011, Funimation released the film in the United States. The contents of the Blu-ray/DVD Combo Pack contains movie in Japanese with English subtitles. The Blu-ray/DVD Combo Pack contains Special Features and making-ofs.

Plot 
By 2025, fifteen years after the events of Zebraman, Aihara Kozou has been elected governor of Tokyo, which then renamed itself Zebra City. It instituted "Zebra Time", a 5-minute period starting at 5:00 AM/PM during which all crime is legal and the government allows the Zebra Police to attack any and all presumed criminals. Once Zebra Time results in the attempted murder of Shinichi Ichikawa, also known as Zebraman. Shinichi, surviving the attack but having lost his memories, teams up with Shinpei (now a doctor) to save a mysterious little girl from Aihara Kouzou, Zebra Queen and her Zebra Police, and then the world from their ultimate plan to use the strange aliens from 2010 to bring Zebra Time to the whole world.

Cast
Show Aikawa as Shinichi Ichikawa/Zebraman
Riisa Naka as Yui Aihara/Zebra Q/Zebra Queen/Zebrawoman/Black Zebra
Tsuyoshi Abe as Niimi
Masahiro Inoue as Shinpei Asano
Naoki Tanaka as Junpei Ichiba/TV's Zebraman
Guadalcanal Taka as Kozou Aihara
Mei Nagano as Sumire
Nana Mizuki as the Alien Voice
Miki Inase as Yumi Kisaragi/Zebra Mini-Skirt Police
Sayoko Ohashi as Risako Yuki/Zebra Mini-Skirt Police
Yuko Shimizu as Yu Maki/Zebra Mini-Skirt Police
Suzanne as Mika Misaki
Kazuki Namioka as Clothing Designer
Houka Kinoshita as Turtle Who Attacks Aihara
Hideo Nakano as Boar Man
Naomasa Musaka as Surgeon
Ken Maeda as Legislator
Katsuhisa Namase as TV Reporter
Mame Yamada as Miho Kishida

Theme song
For the film, Riisa Naka as the Zebra Queen released a single titled  on April 21, 2010, to serve as the film's theme song. A music video was also released featuring Naka in the character of Zebra Queen singing the song. A music video was also recorded for the other song included on the single, which is also used in the film's trailers. For the music videos and all performances of the song, Riisa has stated Zebra Queen has a Lady Gaga-like persona.

V-Cinema
A direct to video movie called  was released on April 19, 2010, to promote the upcoming release of Zebraman 2. The story is set in 2024, one year before the events of the sequel, and focuses on the characters of the Zebra Mini-Skirt Police. The film also features Suzu Natsume as Sayuri Yuki, Shinji Kasahara as a rebel, Yasukaze Motomiya as Ogata, and Guadalcanal Taka as Kozou Aihara.

References

External links
 Official website
 
 The Vengeful Zebra Mini-Skirt Plice official website
 Zebraman official channel

2010 films
Films directed by Takashi Miike
Funimation
Toei tokusatsu films
Films with screenplays by Kankurō Kudō
2010s Japanese superhero films
Japanese sequel films
Japanese superhero films
Films set in the future
Films set in 2025
Films about amnesia
Films set in Tokyo
Films set in Yokohama
Films scored by Yoshihiro Ike